Prevotella bryantii, previously known as Bacteroides ruminicola ruminicola subsp. brevis biovar 3, is a species of bacterium.

Prevotella species are part of the human oral and vaginal microbiota. They play a role in the pathogenesis of periodontal disease, gingivitis, extraoral and some odontogenic infections, and strains are usually carried in families, in so-called intrafamilial carriage. It is also associated with carotid atherosclerosis.

References

Further reading
Species clustering:

External links

Microbe wiki
LPSN
Type strain of Prevotella bryantii at BacDive -  the Bacterial Diversity Metadatabase

Bacteroidia
Bacteria described in 1997